Yitzhak Danziger (26 June 1916 – 11 July 1977) was an Israeli sculptor. He was one of the pioneer sculptors of the Canaanite Movement, and later joined the "Ofakim Hadashim" (New Horizons) group.

Early life 
Danziger was born in Berlin in 1916 to a Zionist family. His father was a surgeon and served in the German Army during World War I.

The family immigrated to then Mandate Palestine in 1923 and settled in Jerusalem.  Danziger studied art at the Slade School of Fine Art 1934–37. He was influenced by his visits to the British Museum, the Anthropological Museum and the art from Ancient Egypt, Assyria, Babylon, Persia, India and Oceania and Africa. These would later on play an important role in his sculptures.

Career
He returned to Palestine and set up a studio at Tel Aviv in 1937.

Danziger created his statue "Nimrod" in 1938–1939. The statue is 90 centimetres high and made of Red Nubian Sandstone imported from Petra in Jordan. It depicts Nimrod as a naked hunter, uncircumcised, carrying a bow and with a hawk on his shoulder. The style shows the influence of Ancient Egyptian statues.

The unveiling of the statue caused a scandal. The Hebrew University of Jerusalem which had commissioned Danziger's statue was not happy with the result and religious circles made strong protests.

Within a few years, however, the statue was universally acclaimed as a major masterpiece of Israeli art, and has noticeably influenced and inspired the work of later sculptors, painters, writers and poets up to the present.

The Nimrod Statue was also taken up as the emblem of a cultural-political movement known as "The Canaanites", which advocated the shrugging off of the Jewish religious tradition, cutting off relations with Diaspora Jews and their culture, and adopting in its place a "Hebrew Identity" based on ancient Semitic heroic myths – such as Nimrod's. Though never gaining mass support, the movement had a considerable influence on Israeli intellectuals in the 1940s and early 1950s.

Awards 
 1945, the Dizengoff Prize for Sculpture.
 1958 Milo Club Award, Kiryat Ono Monument Prize, Tel Aviv
 1968, the Israel Prize, in sculpture.
 1969, Sandberg Prize,  in sculpture, Israel Museum of Jerusalem

See also
List of Israel Prize recipients

References
General
 

Specific

External links
 
 
 
 

German emigrants to Mandatory Palestine
Israel Prize in sculpture recipients
Sandberg Prize recipients
Canaanites (movement)
Alumni of the Slade School of Fine Art
1916 births
1977 deaths
20th-century Israeli sculptors
20th-century Israeli painters
Road incident deaths in Israel